Simon Suoranta (born 21 May 1992) is a Finnish professional ice hockey player currently signed to French Ligue Magnus side Dragons de Rouen. He last played for the Nottingham Panthers of the UK's Elite Ice Hockey League (EIHL).

Suoranta made his SM-Liiga debut playing with Oulun Kärpät during the 2011–12 SM-liiga season.

He played 22 games for Ässät before suffering an injury that kept him out for the rest of the 2017–18 season. In May 2018, Suoranta joined HC TPS, making his season debut on 14 November against Vaasan Sport.

After an 18-month spell with Vaasan Sport, Suoranta agreed to his first contract outside Finland and signed with English side Nottingham Panthers in July 2021. He departed Nottingham in December 2021, along with compatriot Tommi Jokinen.

In January 2022, Suoranta moved to France to sign for top-flight side Dragons de Rouen.

Career statistics

References

External links

1992 births
Living people
Finnish ice hockey forwards
Oulun Kärpät players
Hokki players
Sportspeople from Vaasa
Ässät players
HC TPS players
Vaasan Sport players
Nottingham Panthers players
Dragons de Rouen players